Yves Hervochon (13 June 1935 – 27 August 2020) was a French painter. He won several regional prizes in Brittany, and two of his paintings were purchased by the City of Rennes.

Biography
Hervochon began painting at age 15 while taking drawing lessons at the École régionale des beaux-arts de Rennes and attending workshops of Mariano Otero and Pierre Gilles. From 1975 to 1980, he began to assert himself as a Breton painter, taking the pseudonym Yv K'hervochon.

Hervochon painted nature primarily, emphasizing the weather and time of year. His colors were often rich and cheerful. He painted landscapes, marine life, villages, etc.

Yves Hervochon died on 27 August 2020 in Rennes at the age of 85.

Prizes
Prize of the City of Fougères
Prize of the City of Saintes
5th International Prize of Fribourg
2nd Prize of Côte de Penthièvre
2nd Prize of Val d'Or
1st Prize of Belle-Isle-en-Terre
1st Prize of Jugon-les-Lacs
1st Prize of Cesson-Sévigné

Works

References

1935 births
2020 deaths
20th-century French painters
Artists from Rennes
21st-century French painters